Arcos Bosques is an office and shopping complex in Bosques de las Lomas, Cuajimalpa borough, Mexico City, Mexico, very close to the Santa Fe business district. There are two office towers, Torre I and Torre II, and a shopping center, Paseo Arcos Bosques.

Tower I
Arcos Bosques Torre 1 or officially known as Arcos Bosques Corporativo Torre Oriente, is a prominent skyscraper in Mexico City. It was designed by Teodoro González de León. It is 36 stories tall, with 33 levels of office space, and also equipped with a heli-pad. It is composed of two parallel columns of 31 floors and 4 more floors at the top joined by a lintel. It is colloquially known as El Pantalón ("The Trousers"). As of now, it is the second-tallest building in the Santa Fe area, which was surpassed by the Torre Altus in 1998. It is also currently the sixth-tallest building in Mexico City, as well as the tenth-tallest in the entire country.

Tower II
See article in Spanish Wikipedia

Arcos Bosques Torre II consists of connected twin towers, and its address is Paseo de los Tamarindos #400B. It includes a five-star hotel (Aqua Bosques) and a high-end shopping center. Each floor is between 1600 and 1655 m2, and the total floor space is 98,900 m2.

Paseo Arcos Bosques shopping center
Paseo Arcos Bosques is not one of the largest, but is one of the most exclusive shopping centers in Mexico City. In addition to anchors Cinépolis multicinema and Crate & Barrel, it includes branches of luxury goods retailers Lacoste, Marc by Marc Jacobs, Pink, Swarovski etc. In December 2019, the second Shake Shack in Mexico City opened in the shopping center.

External links
Paseo Arcos Bosques shopping center website

References

Skyscrapers in Mexico City
Skyscraper hotels
Skyscraper office buildings in Mexico City
Miguel Hidalgo, Mexico City
Mixed-use developments in Mexico
Shopping malls in Greater Mexico City